Joey Chestnut (born November 25, 1983) is an American competitive eater. As of 2022, he is ranked first in the world by Major League Eating. He resides in Westfield, Indiana.

On July 4, 2007, Chestnut won the 92nd Annual Nathan's Hot Dog Eating Contest held at New York, New York. Joey defeated six-time defending champion Takeru "Tsunami" Kobayashi by consuming a world record 66 hot dogs and buns (HDB) in 12 minutes, after losing to Kobayashi in 2005 and 2006. The following year, he successfully defended his title by winning a five hot dog eat-off after tying Kobayashi in consuming 59 HDB in ten minutes. On July 4, 2009, Chestnut beat Kobayashi again, by consuming a world record 68 HDB and winning his third consecutive title. On July 4, 2010, Chestnut took home his 4th consecutive Mustard Belt eating 54 HDB. The 2010 contest was a runaway victory, as Kobayashi did not compete due to a contract dispute with Major League Eating. On July 4, 2011, he won his fifth-consecutive championship with 62 HDB. 2012 marked his sixth consecutive win, when Chestnut tied his own world record from 2009 by devouring 68 HDB. In 2013, Chestnut captured his seventh straight title, eating a total of 69 HDB, breaking his previous world record. In 2014, Chestnut captured his eighth straight title eating a total of 61 HDB.

Chestnut lost the 2015 Nathan's Hot Dog Eating Contest to Matt Stonie. On July 4, 2016, Chestnut regained the championship belt from Stonie by eating 70 hot dogs, 3.5 hot dogs short of his record-setting qualifying round. A year later on July 4, 2017, he raised the bar again by raising his record to 72 hot dogs; and again the following year to a world record of 74. In 2019, he secured a twelfth title with 71 HDB, but failed to beat his previous record. In 2020, he consumed 75 HDB, a world record for the contest. In 2021, he consumed 76 HDB, breaking his own world record for the contest. In 2022, in a return to the corner of Surf and Stillwell Avenues, he consumed 63 Nathan's Famous HDB, his 15th championship, despite a ruptured tendon in his leg.

History

2005
Chestnut, a San Jose State University student, entered the competitive eating scene in 2005 with a break-out performance in the deep-fried asparagus eating championship, in which he beat high-ranked eater Rich LeFevre by eating  of asparagus in 11.5 minutes. That same year, during Nathan's Hot Dog Eating Contest, he ate 32 HDB, placing third behind Takeru Kobayashi and Sonya Thomas.

On October 22, 2005, Chestnut set a new world record for downing 32.5 grilled cheese sandwiches in ten minutes at the Arizona State Fair, as part of the GoldenPalace.net World Grilled Cheese Eating Championship circuit.

Chestnut defeated Thomas in the Waffle House World Waffle Eating Championship and placed second to Kobayashi in a Krystal Square Off World Hamburger Eating Championship qualifier, eating 56 Krystal Burgers in eight minutes to his 67. He later beat her by eating 91 hamburgers in the finals, finishing second to the 97 hamburgers consumed by Kobayashi.

2006
Chestnut qualified for the 2006 Nathan's Contest by eating 50 HDB. As July 4 approached, there was speculation that 2006 might be the year when Kobayashi would be beaten. It was not to be, however. Chestnut lost to Kobayashi in the Johnsonville World Bratwurst Eating Championship in Sheboygan, Wisconsin. He ate 45 bratwurst sausages in ten minutes. Kobayashi ate 58.

2007
In 2007, Chestnut won the Wing Bowl XV, an annual Philadelphia event at the Wachovia Center. In this competition, he ate 182 chicken wings in 30 minutes, becoming a Wing Bowl champion and record holder.

Chestnut was seen on a YouTube video drinking a gallon of milk in 41 seconds.

On July 4, 2007, Chestnut and Kobayashi battled the field in a record-setting hot dog eating battle in Coney Island in Brooklyn, New York, at Nathan's Hot Dog Eating Contest. Chestnut knocked off Kobayashi 66–63, leading to the latter's first defeat in the contest in six years.

On October 28, 2007, between 2:33 and 2:41, Chestnut ate 103 Krystal burgers in the Krystal Square Off World Hamburger Eating Championship in Chattanooga, Tennessee. This was Chestnut's personal best, and is the new world record.

2008
Chestnut set two new world records in 2008. On February 1, he ate 241 wings in 30 minutes at the Wing Bowl XVI in Philadelphia. This record was broken by Takeru Kobayashi at the Wing Bowl XX in 2011 with 337 wings.

On March 2, 2008, he ate 78 matzo balls during Kenny & Ziggy's World Matzoh Ball Eating Championship in Houston, Texas.

On March 24, 2008, Chestnut set a new male record at The Big Texan Steak Ranch restaurant in Amarillo, Texas by eating a meal of  ribeye steak, salad, baked potato, shrimp cocktail, and roll in just eight minutes and 52 seconds. Shortly afterwards, on his show on KKLA, previous record holder Frank Pastore congratulated Chestnut. (The overall human record is 4 minutes and 18 seconds, set by Molly Schuyler on April 19, 2015, on her first of three meals.)

On June 21, 2008, Chestnut lost to Takeru Kobayashi in a Pizza Hut P'Zone competition at Sony Studios in Culver City, California. The competition aired on Spike TV on June 21.

On July 4, 2008, Chestnut tied Takeru Kobayashi in the annual Nathan's Hot Dog Contest after eating 59 HDB in ten minutes. The tie resulted in a 5 HDB eat-off, which Chestnut won by consuming all five HDBs before Kobayashi. The 59 is a new record in the competition based on the reduction from 12 minutes to ten minutes.

On July 28, 2008, Chestnut lost to Takeru Kobayashi in Chicken Satay eating in the MLE Asia inaugural event.

On August 23, 2008, Chestnut defeated IFOCE's second highest-ranked competitive eater Pat "Deep Dish" Bertoletti in the second Gyoza Eating Championship in Little Tokyo, Los Angeles, California. He devoured 231 gyoza, setting a new world record; he beat his previous record of 212, set at the inaugural event in 2006 when he narrowly defeated Sonya "Black Widow" Thomas (210). Thomas did not attend the 2008 event due to budgetary and travel costs.

On October 12, 2008, he consumed 45 slices of pizza, winning the "Famous Famiglia World Pizza Eating Championship", which was held in Times Square in New York. This was beaten by Bertoletti with 47 slices a few weeks later.

2009
On February 21, 2009, Chestnut consumed  of macaroni and cheese in seven minutes during halftime at the San Jose Stealth lacrosse game, beating out his contestants and adding another world record to his name.

On July 4, 2009, Chestnut topped his previous record of 59 HDB by consuming 68 HDB in the 2009 Nathan's Hot Dog Eating Contest.

On September 27, 2009, Chestnut lost to Takeru Kobayashi in Krystal Square Off World Hamburger Eating Championship. He ate 81 hamburgers. Kobayashi ate 93.

On Man v.

2010
On May 8, 2010, Chestnut won Shrimp Wontons eating in Singapore. Chestnut ate 380 wontons in eight minutes to set a new world record.

On July 4, 2010, Chestnut secured his fourth straight Nathan's Hotdog Eating Contest, by consuming 54 HDB in what he described himself as a disappointing performance.

On September 25, 2010, at the Phantom Gourmet Food Fest in Boston, Massachusetts, Chestnut won the Upper Crust Pizza Eating competition by eating 37 slices in ten minutes. He beat Bob Shoudt by one slice.

2011
On July 4, 2011, Chestnut secured his fifth straight Nathan's Hotdog Eating Contest, by consuming 62 HDB. Kobayashi, who could not participate in the contest because of his refusal to sign the required contract, ate 69 HDB at an off-site event with independent judges to establish a new world record.

2012

On March 17, 2012, Chestnut set a new world record by eating 20  corned beef sandwiches in ten minutes at the annual Toojay's Corned Beef Eating Competition in Palm Beach Gardens, Florida. Pat "Deep Dish" Bertoletti finished in second place.

On July 4, 2012, Chestnut successfully defended his title at Nathan's 97th Annual Hot Dog Eating Contest at Coney Island in Brooklyn, New York. He tied his own world record by swallowing 68 HDB in ten minutes, which earned him his 6th "mustard belt" for this competition.

On July 16, 2012, Chestnut made a guest appearance on the 12th episode of Hell's Kitchen season 10, in which he participated in a wing-eating competition against a few of the contestants. He ended up winning the contest and earned $500.

On August 27, 2012, Chestnut cursed at Hofmann Hot dog and Kobayashi, stating in a Twitter post, "Congrats to @FReeKobio704 for eating a bunch of nasty Hoffman crap dogs. He needed an ego boost after three years of dodging competition."

On September 2, 2012, Chestnut consumed 191 wings in 12 minutes to win the 1st place competitive-eating trophy at the National Buffalo Wing Festival in Buffalo, New York. He defeated the previous five-year champion Sonya Thomas.

On October 13, 2012, Chestnut won the Third Annual Smoke's Poutinerie World Poutine Eating Championships in Toronto, Ontario by consuming 19 boxes of poutine in ten minutes.

2013
On July 4, 2013, Chestnut successfully defended his title at Nathan's 98th Annual Hot Dog Eating Contest at Coney Island in Brooklyn, New York. He beat his own world record of 68 by consuming 69 HDB in ten minutes, which earned him his 7th Mustard Belt for this competition.

On July 25, 2013, Chestnut ate 179 wings in ten minutes taking the title for the second year in a row at the Hooters World Wing-Eating Championship held in Clearwater, Florida.

On September 22, 2013, Chestnut ate 70 bratwursts to set the world record and take his fourth straight title, at the Hillshire Farm Bratwurst Eating World Championship held at Oktoberfest Zinzinnati in Cincinnati, Ohio.

2014
On July 4, 2014, Chestnut ate more hot dogs and buns than any of his opponents, narrowly defeating competitor Matt Stonie. He successfully ate 61 hot dogs and buns to Stonie's 56, making this his eighth consecutive win. Prior to the event, Chestnut proposed to his longtime girlfriend, Neslie Ricasa.

2015
On July 4, 2015, Chestnut was defeated by Stonie. He successfully ate 60 hot dogs and buns, but Stonie improved since 2014 and consumed 62 hot dogs and buns, ending Chestnut's eight-year run as champion.

After a Denver Outlaws lacrosse game on May 24, Chestnut set a World Record eating 14.25lbs of Illegal Pete's Burritos in 10 minutes, beating the previous record of 11.81 set in 2007 by Tim "Eater X" Janus.

2016
On July 4, 2016, Chestnut redeemed himself with 70 hot dogs and buns with Stonie behind with 53 hot dogs and buns. On September 4, 2016, he won his third consecutive title at the United States Chicken Wing Eating Championships in Buffalo, New York by eating 188 wings in 12 minutes.

2017
On July 4, 2017, Chestnut defended his title and ate 72 hot dogs and buns. This was his 10th title and once again set a new Nathan's Hot Dog Eating Contest record. Carmen Cincotti was the closest competitor with 60.

2018
In 2018, Chestnut competed in The Amazing Race 30 alongside fellow competitive eater Tim Janus. On July 4, Chestnut won his 11th title at Nathan's Hot Dog Eating Contest with a new record of 74 hot dogs and buns.

2019
On July 4, 2019, Chestnut won his 12th title at Nathan's Hot Dog Eating Contest, eating 71 hot dogs and buns.
On October 19, 2019, Chestnut won the 2019 World Poutine Eating Championship in Toronto, Canada, after eating 28 pounds of poutine in 10 minutes and set a new world record.

2020
On July 4, 2020, Chestnut won his 13th title at Nathan's Hot Dog Eating Contest, eating a record-breaking 75 hot dogs and buns in ten minutes. The event was held indoors, with fewer competitors and without spectators, due to COVID-19.

On August 1, 2020, Chestnut ate  of pizza in 32 minutes and 14 seconds in a MrBeast YouTube video in Greenville, North Carolina.

On October 1, 2020, Chestnut guest starred on the animated series Scooby-Doo and Guess Who?, voicing himself.

2021
On July 4, 2021, Chestnut won his 14th title at Nathan's Hot Dog Eating Contest, eating 76 hot dogs and buns in 10 minutes, a new record.

On October 10, 2021, Chestnut won The 2021 Destination Outlets World Pumpkin Pie Eating Championship in Jeffersonville, Ohio, consuming 16 lbs 12 oz of Pumpkin Pie in 8 minutes.

2022
On July 4, 2022, Chestnut captured his 15th Nathan’s Hot Dog Eating Contest title by eating 63 hot dogs and buns in 10 minutes. The contest was interrupted by a protestor, whom Chestnut placed in a chokehold.

Training

Chestnut trains by fasting and by stretching his stomach with milk, water and protein supplements. After winning his sixth consecutive hot dog eating contest in 2012 by eating 68 hot dogs, he stated, "I will not stop until I reach 70. This sport isn't about eating. It's about drive and dedication, and at the end of the day, hot dog eating challenges both my body and my mind." 
He says he trains for hot dog eating competitions by cooking hot dogs at his house and then eating them in a simulated competition style. He starts with 40 hot dogs and then works his way up until he is in game shape. He compared it to running or lifting weights for other athletes.

Personal life
Chestnut was born in Fulton County, Kentucky, and grew up in Vallejo, California. He holds a degree in engineering and construction management from San Jose State University.

He proposed to his longtime girlfriend Neslie Ricasa just before defending his title in the 2014 Nathan's competition. The couple split up in early 2015, prior to their scheduled wedding date. Chestnut currently resides in Westfield, Indiana.

World records held

2007
Chicken wings – Long Form: 182 wings in 30 minutes (Wachovia Center in Philadelphia, Pennsylvania on February 2, 2007) at the Wing Bowl
Krystal hamburgers: 103 Krystal Burgers in eight minutes (Chattanooga, Tennessee on October 28, 2007) at the Krystal Square Off
Kolaches: 56 sausage and cheese kolaches in eight minutes (Houston, Texas on September 14, 2007) at the Kolache Factory World Kolache Eating Championship
 Pulled pork sandwiches: 45 sandwiches in ten minutes (Myrtle Beach, South Carolina on September 1, 2007) at the Myrtle Beach World BBQ Eating Championship

2008
Steak Big Texan 72oz Steak 8:52

2009
Funnel cake:  in ten minutes (Kings Dominion in Doswell, Virginia on May 23, 2009) at the Kings Dominion World Funnel Cake Championship

2011
Philly cheesesteak: 23 sandwiches in ten minutes (Dorney Park & Wildwater Kingdom in Allentown, Pennsylvania on May 21, 2011) at the World CheeseSteak Eating Championship @ Dorney Park
Pizza Hut P'Zones: 7.5 P'Zones in ten minutes (Spike Guys' Choice Awards in Los Angeles, California on June 4, 2011) at the Pizza Hut P'Zone Eating CHOW-lenge
Salt potatoes:  of salt potatoes (Baldwinsville, New York on May 14, 2011) at the Salt Potato World Eating Championship 
Taco Bell tacos: 53 soft beef tacos in ten minutes (San Juan, Puerto Rico on July 29, 2011) at the Taco Bell Why Pay More Soft Taco Challenge

2012
Corned beef sandwich – 20 sandwiches in ten minutes (Palm Beach Gardens, Florida on March 17, 2012) at The 3rd Annual TooJay's World Class Corned Beef Eating Championship
Tamales: 102 tamales in 12 minutes (Lewisville, Texas on September 29, 2012) at the Western Days Festival World Tamale Eating Championship

2013
Apple pie: 4.375 pies in eight minutes (Brunswick, Ohio, September 13, 2013) at Mapleside Farms World Apple Pie Eating Championship
Brain tacos: 54 tacos in eight minutes (Minneapolis, Minnesota, October 12, 2013) at The World Brain Eating Competition – Zombie Pub Crawl
Hard boiled eggs: 141 hard-boiled eggs in eight minutes (Radcliff, Kentucky on October 5, 2013) at the Radcliff Fall Festival
Pastrami: 25 Katz's Delicatessen half pastrami sandwiches in ten minutes (Manhattan, New York on June 2, 2013) at the Katz's Delicatessen World Pastrami Eating Championship
Pork ribs:  pork rib meat (John Ascuaga's Nugget Casino in Sparks, Nevada on August 28, 2013) at John Ascuaga's Nugget World Rib Eating Championship during the Best in the West Nugget Rib Cook-off Seen in episode of Travel Channel’s Hotel Impossible
Twinkies: 121 Twinkies in six minutes (Bally's Casino Tunica in Tunica Resorts, Mississippi on October 26, 2013) at The World Twinkie Eating Championship At Bally's Casino – Tunica

2014
 Deep-fried asparagus:  of deep-fried asparagus in ten minutes (Stockton, California, April 26, 2014) at Stockton Asparagus Festival
Fish tacos: 30 tacos in five minutes (Winnipeg, Manitoba, Canada on August 9, 2013) at Joey Chestnut vs. Joey's All-Stars Fish Taco World Record Challenge Presented by Joey's Seafood Restaurants 
Gyoza: 384 gyoza in ten minutes (Los Angeles, California on August 16, 2014) at The Day-Lee Foods World Gyoza Eating Championship
Pierogi: 165 pierogi in eight minutes (Horseshoe Casino Hammond in Hammond, Indiana on October 8, 2014) at the Horseshoe World Pierogi-Eating Championship
Pulled pork sliders: 62 sliders in ten minutes (Atmore, Alabama on March 28, 2014) at the Pork Slider Eating Contest at Wind Creek's Throw Down
Turkey (whole):  of whole turkey in ten minutes (Foxwoods Resort Casino in Ledyard, Connecticut on November 22, 2014) at the Foxwoods World Turkey-Eating Championship

2015
Gumbo: 15 bowls (1.875 gallons) in eight minutes (Larose, Louisiana on November 7, 2015) at the World Record Gumbo Eating Championship

2016
Boysenberry pie:  of pie in eight minutes (Knott's Berry Farm in Buena Park, California on March 19, 2016) at The Knott's Boysenberry Festival World Pie Eating Contest
Burritos – Long Form: 14.5 burritos in ten minutes (Sports Authority Field at Mile High in Denver, Colorado on May 28, 2016) at The Denver Outlaws World Burrito Eating Championship Presented by Illegal Pete's
Gyros: 30 gyros in ten minutes (Houston, Texas on May 15, 2016) at Niko Niko's World Gyro Eating Championship
Meat pies: 23 meat pies in ten minutes (Bay St. Louis, Mississippi on March 5, 2016) at The Silver Slipper World Meat Pie Eating Championship

2017
 Glazed doughnuts: 55 doughnuts in eight minutes (Santa Monica, California on June 2, 2017) at The Salvation Army National Donut Day World Donut Eating Championship
Tacos – Traditional (three-inch tortilla): 126 tacos in eight minutes (Prior Lake, Minnesota on May 5, 2017) at the Mystic Lake Casino Hotel World Taco Eating Championship
 White Hut cheeseburgers: 52 Cheeseburgers in ten minutes (West Springfield, Massachusetts on September 23, 2017) at The White Hut World Cheeseburg Eating Championship At The Big E

2018
 Hostess Donettes: 257 Hostess Donettes in 6 minutes (Philadelphia, Pennsylvania, on June 1, 2018) at The World Hostess Donettes Eating Championship
 Ice cream sandwiches: 25.5 sandwiches in six minutes (Petco Park in San Diego, California on June 3, 2018) at The Baked Bear World Ice-Cream Sandwich Eating Championship
Mutton sandwich: 81 mutton sandwiches in ten minutes (International Bar-B-Q Festival in Owensboro, Kentucky on May 12, 2018) at The Owensboro International Bar-B-Q Festival World Mutton Sandwich-Eating Championship
San Pedro Fish Market shrimp:  of shrimp in eight minutes (San Pedro, California on May 28, 2018) at The San Pedro Fish Market World Famous Shrimp Eating Championship presented by The Kings of Fi$h on the USS Iowa
 Shrimp cocktail:  of St. Elmo shrimp cocktail in eight minutes (Indianapolis, Indiana on December 1, 2018) at The World Famous St. Elmo Shrimp Cocktail Eating Championship

2019
Croquettes: 185 croquettes in ten minutes (Miami, Florida on March 10, 2019) at El Croquetazo at Calle Ocho Music Festival presented by Catalina
 Pepperoni rolls: 43 pepperoni rolls in ten minutes (Fairmont, West Virginia on May 25, 2019) at The West Virginia Three Rivers Festival Pepperoni Roll Eating World Championship
 Canteen sandwiches: 28.5 Canteen sandwiches in ten minutes (Canteen Lunch in the Alley in Ottumwa, Iowa on June 1, 2019) at The 2019 World Championship Canteen Sandwich Eating Contest 
Pizza (2-foot slices): 6.5 slices in ten minutes (Metairie, Louisiana on August 25, 2019) at The 2019 Fat Boy's Pizza Eating Championship
Pork roll sandwiches: 61.5 sandwiches in ten minutes (Trenton, New Jersey on September 21, 2019) at River Fest Featuring the Trenton Thunder World Famous Case's Pork Roll Eating Championship
Carnitas tacos: 82 tacos in eight minutes (Pacific Park in Santa Monica, California on October 4, 2019) at The 2019 Pacific Park World Taco Eating Championship
Poutine:  of poutine in ten minutes (Toronto, Ontario, Canada on October 19, 2019) at the 10th Annual Smoke's Poutinerie World Poutine Eating Championship 
Grilled cheese sandwich: 47 sandwiches in ten minutes (Thomas & Mack Center in Port Charlotte, Florida on June 10, 2019) at the GoldenPalace.net World Grilled Cheese Eating Contest – World record currently held by Ali Waters (The Florida State Champion)

2020
Big Macs: 32 Big Macs in 38 minutes 15 seconds on March 5, 2020
Red Beans and Rice: 39.5 bowls (24lbs and 11 ounces or ~36,268 calories) in eight minutes in the city of New Orleans for the Blue Runner Red Beans and Rice Major League Eating Contest

2021
Hot dogs: 76 Nathan's hot dogs and buns (HDB) in −10 minutes (Coney Island, New York on July 4, 2021) at the Nathan's Hot Dog Eating Contest

2022
Chicken Fingers: 44 Raising Cane's chicken fingers in 5 minutes (Las Vegas, Nevada on July 27, 2022)
Popcorn (24 ounces): 32 servings in 8 minutes (Victory Field in Indianapolis, Indiana on August 22, 2022) at an Indianapolis Indians game

See also
 List of competitive eaters

References

External links

 
 International Federation of Competitive Eating (IFOCE) profile
 Sports Illustrated feature on 2006 contest
 The Wave Magazine profile and interview
 Photos from the TripRewards 2007 Ultimate Hotwing Eating Contest
Eat Feats Profile

Living people
American competitive eaters
San Jose State University alumni
Sportspeople from San Jose, California
Sportspeople from Vallejo, California
The Amazing Race (American TV series) contestants
1983 births